The Petersfield by election took place during the 1959 to 1964 parliament of the United Kingdom.

It was called when the sitting MP for Petersfield Peter Legh became the 4th Baron Newton on the death of his father . There were three candidates

Joan Quennell, aged 36, a company director representing the Conservatives
Michael Digby, 39, a Colonel in the Army, representing the Liberals
William Royle, 39, a horticulturalist, representing Labour

Polling day took place on Thursday 17 November 1960 and the result was as follows

Quennell held the seat at three further general elections before retiring in October 1974.

Notes

Petersfield by-election
Petersfield
Petersfield
Petersfield by-election 1960
20th century in Hampshire